Ghk.

Gamma-glutamyl hydrolase is an enzyme that catalyses the following chemical reaction:

 Hydrolysis of a gamma-glutamyl bond

This lysosomal or secreted, thiol-dependent peptidase, most active at acidic pH.

In humans, gamma-glutamyl hydrolase is encoded by the GGH gene. This gene catalyzes the hydrolysis of folylpoly-gamma-glutamates and antifolylpoly-gamma-glutamates by the removal of gamma-linked polyglutamates and glutamate.

Nomenclature 

Gamma-glutamyl hydrolase is also known as conjugase, folate conjugase, lysosomal gamma-glutamyl carboxypeptidase, gamma-Glu-X carboxypeptidase, pteroyl-poly-gamma-glutamate hydrolase, carboxypeptidase G, folic acid conjugase, poly(gamma-glutamic acid) endohydrolase, polyglutamate hydrolase, poly(glutamic acid) hydrolase II, pteroylpoly-gamma-glutamyl hydrolase.

Interactive pathway map

References

Further reading

External links 
 
 

EC 3.4.19